Gongpoquansaurus (meaning "Gongpoquan reptile") is an extinct genus of basal hadrosauroid dinosaur that was not formally named until 2014, while the name was a nomen nudum for many years previously. It is known from IVPP V.11333, a partial skull and postcranial skeleton. It was collected in 1992 at locality IVPP 9208–21, from the Albian Zhonggou Formation (Xinminpu Group), in Mazongshan, Gansu Province, China. The specimen was first described and named by Lü Junchang in 1997 as the third species of Probactrosaurus, Probactrosaurus mazongshanensis. Following its description, several studies found it to be less derived than the type species of Probactrosaurus in relation to Hadrosauridae. Therefore, "Gongpoquansaurus" had been suggested, yet informally, as a replacement generic name. In 2014, the species was formally redescribed, and the describers erected Gongpoquansaurus.

References

Early Cretaceous dinosaurs of Asia
Iguanodonts
Fossil taxa described in 2014
Taxa named by Peter Dodson
Paleontology in Gansu
Taxa named by Lü Junchang
Ornithischian genera